William Hounsell (25 December 1820 – 12 June 1903) was an amateur English first-class cricketer.

Hounsell represented Hampshire in two first-class matches against the All-England Eleven in 1849 and 1850. Hounsell also represented Dorset in numerous minor matches.

Hounsell died at Bridport, Dorset on 12 June 1903.

External links
William Hounsell at Cricinfo
William Hounsell at CricketArchive

1820 births
1903 deaths
People from Bridport
Cricketers from Dorset
English cricketers
Hampshire cricketers